Silaka Nature Reserve is a nature reserve in Eastern Cape Province, South Africa, close to the town of Port St Johns, and managed by Eastern Cape Parks. The park has a small area, only 400 ha, featuring grassland and magnificent indigenous coastal forests. It lies about 7 km south of the town of Port St Johns.

See also

References 
 Eastern Cape Parks

Eastern Cape Provincial Parks
Protected areas of the Eastern Cape